

Level 3 — II liiga / Second league

II Liiga Ida/Põhi

Table

Top scorers

II Liiga Lõuna/Lääs

Table

Top scorers

Level 4 — III liiga / Third league

III Liiga Põhi

Table

Top scorers

III Liiga Lõuna

Table

Top scorers

III Liiga Ida

Table

Top scorers

III Liiga Lääs

Table

Top scorers

Level 5 — IV liiga / Fourth league

IV Liiga Põhi

Table

Top scorers

IV Liiga Lõuna

Table

Top scorers

IV Liiga Ida

Table

Top scorers

IV Liiga Lääs

Table

Top scorers

See also
 2008 Meistriliiga
 2008 Esiliiga
 2008 Estonian Lower Leagues
 2007–08 Estonian Cup

References

External links
 Estonian Football Association –2008  2009–

3
Estonia
Estonia
Estonia
Estonia